General Metcalf or Metcalfe may refer to:

Charles Metcalfe (British Army officer) (1856–1912), British Army major general
Charles D. Metcalf (born 1933), U.S. Air Force major general
John Francis Metcalfe (1908–1975), British Army major general
Wilder Metcalf (1855–1935), U.S. Army major general